Psychoides gosari is a moth of the family Tineidae first described by Seok Kim and Yang-Seop Bae in 2007 from pupae collected from Mount Hwaya in Gyeonggi Province. It is endemic to South Korea.

Nomenclature
The specific name is derived from gosari, the Korean name for its host plants.

Ecology
The moth is found in fern communities, within forested areas in mountain passes. The larvae feed on the sporangia or fronds of the following species,
 Athyrium yokoscense
 Dryopteris bissetiana
 Dryopteris chinensis
 Dryopteris crassirhizoma
 Dryopteris saxifraga

Pupae were collected from the lower surface of a frond of Dryopteris in Mount Hwaya, Gyeonggi Provence, emerging as adults in a laboratory.

References

Tineidae
Endemic fauna of South Korea
Moths described in 2007
Moths of Korea